Eva is an apple variety developed in Brazil  in 1999 by researchers in the Instituto Agronômico do Paraná. Like the Julieta cultivar, Eva apples grow and are productive even in tropical climates.

References

 in Portuguese

Apple cultivars
Brazilian apples